The following lists events that happened during 1970 in Singapore.

Incumbents
President: Yusof Ishak (until 23 November), Yeoh Ghim Seng (Acting) (23 November to 2 January 1971)
Prime Minister: Lee Kuan Yew

Events

May
 2 May – The Queenstown Branch Library (now Queenstown Community Library) is opened to the public, making it Singapore's first branch library.
 14 May – The National Junior College opens as Singapore's first junior college. 6 to 8 more junior colleges are announced over the next few years as part of a new education plan, along with more ASEAN students and scholarships, a new hostel in Outram by September and the St John's School to be run by a trust.

July
 8 July – Singapore's first kidney transplant is performed on 29-year-old Doreen Tan at the Outram Park General Hospital (present day Singapore General Hospital), led by Chan Kong Thoe. The operation is declared a success.

August
 4 August – The Ministry of Health announced more hawker centres to be built within five years to resettle all street hawkers, resulting in greater hygiene and better facilities. For a start, three such hawker centres will be built this year.
 11 August The Ministry of Interior and Defence splits, forming the Ministry of Defence and Ministry of Home Affairs to better cater for defence and homeland security functions.

September
 September - Singapore is admitted into the Non-Aligned Movement.

October
 1 October – The first shopping mall in Singapore, the People's Park Complex, is opened.

November
 23 November – Singapore's first President Yusof Ishak dies while in office. Speaker of Parliament Yeoh Ghim Seng temporarily serves as acting president during that time.

Births
 22 June – Glenn Ong – radio DJ.
 22 August – Gwee Li Sui – Poet, graphic artist, critic.
 31 August – Baey Yam Keng – Politician.
 10 November – Tay Ping Hui – Actor, director.
 Dave Chua – Author of Gone Case.
 Paul Tan – Poet, winner of 1993 and 1997 Singapore Literature Prize.

Deaths
23 November – Yusof bin Ishak, 1st President of Singapore (b. 1910).

References

 
Singapore
Years in Singapore